Interspecies communication is communication between different species of animals, plants, or microorganisms.

Mutualism

Cooperative interspecies communication implies sharing and understanding information between two or more species that work towards the benefit of both species (mutualism).  

Since the 1970s, primatologist Sue Savage-Rumbaugh has been working with primates at Georgia State University's Language Research Center (LRC), and more recently, the Iowa Primate Learning Sanctuary. In 1985, using lexigram symbols, a keyboard and monitor, and other computer technology, Savage-Rumbaugh began her groundbreaking work with Kanzi, a male bonobo (P. paniscus). Her research has made significant contributions to a growing body of work in sociobiology studying language learning in non-human primates and exploring the role of language and communication as an evolutionary mechanism.

Koko, a lowland gorilla, began learning a modified American Sign Language as an infant, when Francine "Penny" Patterson, PhD, started working with her in 1975. Penny and Koko worked together at the Gorilla Foundation in one of the longest interspecies communication studies ever conducted until Koko's death in 2018. Koko had a vocabulary of over 1000 signs, and understood a greater amount of spoken English.

In April 1998, Koko gave an AOL live chat. Sign language was used to relay to Koko questions from the online audience of 7,811 AOL members,   The following is an excerpt from the live chat.

AOL: MInyKitty asks Koko are you going to have a baby in the future?
PENNY: OK, is that for Koko? Koko are you going to have a baby in the future?
KOKO: Koko-love eat ... sip.
AOL: Me too!
PENNY: What about a baby? You going to have baby? She's just thinking...her hands are together...
KOKO: Unattention.
PENNY: Oh poor sweetheart. She said 'unattention.' She covered her face with her hands..which means it's not happening, basically, or it hasn't happened yet. . . I don't see it.
AOL: That's sad!
PENNY: It is responding to the question. In other words, she hasn't had one yet, and she doesn't see a future here. The way the situation is actually with Koko & Ndume, she has 2 males to 1 female which is the reverse of what she needs. I think that is why she said that, because in our current situation, it isn't possible for her to have a baby. She needs several females and one male to have a family.

Research observing cooperative communication has largely focused on primates, and predatory animals. Red-fronted lemurs and sifakas recognize one another's alarm calls. The same has been found in West African Diana monkey and Campbell's monkeys. When one species elicits an alarm signal specific to a certain predator, the other species react in the same pattern as the species that called. For example, leopards hunt both species by capitalizing the elements of stealth and surprise. If the monkeys detect the leopard before it attacks (usually resulting in mobbing), the leopard will typically not attack. Therefore, when a leopard alarm call is given, both species respond by positioning near the leopard signaling that it has been found out. It also seems that the monkeys are able to distinguish a leopard alarm call from, for example, a raptor alarm call. When a raptor alarm call is given, the monkeys respond by moving towards the forest floor and away from aerial attack. It is not simply that the monkeys act upon hearing the alarm calls but rather they are able to actually extract particular information from a call. Responses to heterospecific alarm calls are not confined to simian species but have also been found in ground squirrels, specifically the yellow-bellied marmot and the golden-mantled ground squirrel. 
Researchers have determined that bird species are able to understand, or at least respond, to alarms calls by species of mammals and vice versa; red squirrels' acoustic response to raptors is near-identical to that of birds, making the latter also aware to a potential predatory threat, while eastern chipmunks are keen to mobbing calls by eastern tufted titmice.
Whether heterospecific understanding is a learned behavior or not is unclear. In 2000 it was found that age and interspecies experience were important factors in the ability for bonnet macaques to recognize heterospecific calls. Macaques who were exposed longer to other species' alarm calls were more likely to correctly respond to heterospecific alarm calls. Key to this early learning was the reinforcement of a predatory threat, when an alarm call was given a corresponding threat had to be presented in order to make the association. Interspecies communication may not be an innate ability but rather a sort of imprinting coupled with an intense emotion (fear) early in life.  

It is unusual for interspecies communication to be observed in an older animal taking care of a younger animal of a different species. For example, Owen and Mzee, the odd couple of an orphaned baby hippopotamus and a 130-year-old Aldabran tortoise, display this relationship rarely seen in the animal world.  Dr. Kahumbu of the sanctuary that holds the two believes that the two vocalize to one another in neither a stereotypical tortoise nor a hippopotamus fashion.  Owen does not respond to hippopotamus calls. It is likely that when Owen was first introduced to Mzee he was still young enough to be imprinted.

Parasitism and eavesdropping
Unlike cooperative communication, parasitic communication involves an unequal sharing of information (parasitism). In terms of alarm calls, this means that the warnings are not bi-directional. It may be that the other species has simply not been able to decipher the calls of the first species. Much of the research done on this type of communication has been in bird species, including the nuthatch and the great tit. Nuthatches are able to discriminate between subtle differences in chickadee alarm calls, which broadcast the location and size of a predator. Since chickadees and nuthatches typically occupy the same habitat, mobbing predators together acts as a deterrent that benefits both species. Nuthatches screen chickadee alarm calls in order to determine whether it is cost-efficient, in terms of energy consumption, to mob a particular predator, because not all predators pose the same risk to nuthatches as to chickadees. Screening may be most important in the winter when energy demands are the highest.

Work by Gorissen, Gorissen, and Eens (2006) has focused on blue tit song matching (or, "song imitation") by great tits. Blue and great tits compete for resources such as food and nesting cavities and their coexistence has important fitness consequences for both species. These fitness costs might promote interspecific aggression because resources need to be defended against heterospecifics as well. So, the use of efficient vocal strategies such as matching might prove to be effective in interspecific communication. Hence, heterospecific matching could be a way of phrasing a threat in the language of the heterospecfic intruder. It could equally be well argued that these imitations of blue tit sounds have no function at all and are merely the result of learning mistakes in the sensitive period of great tits because blue and great tits form mixed foraging flocks together. While the authors agree with the first hypothesis, it is plausible that the latter also being true given the data on age and experience in primates.

Eavesdropping has been found in tungara frogs and their sympatric heterospecifics. The scientists posit that mixed-species choruses may reduce their risk of predation without increasing mate competition.

Predator–prey
Much of the communication between predators and prey can be defined as signaling. In some animals, the best way to avoid being preyed upon is an advertisement of danger or unpalatability, or aposematism. Given the effectiveness of this, it is no surprise that many animals employ styles of mimicry to ward off predators.  Some predators also use aggressive mimicry as a hunting technique. For example, Photuris fireflies mimic female Photinus fireflies by scent and glow patterns in order to lure interested male Photinus fireflies, which they then kill and eat. Lophiiformes, or anglerfish, are also famous for their use of escas as bait for small unsuspecting fish.

Two examples of predator–prey signaling were found in caterpillars and ground squirrels.  When physically disturbed, Lepidoptera larvae produce a clicking noise with their mandibles followed by an unpalatable oral secretion.  Scientists believe this to be “acoustic aposematism” which has only been previously found in a controlled study with bats and tiger moths.  While the defense mechanisms of ground squirrels to predatory rattlesnakes have been well studied (i.e. tail flagging), only recently have scientists discovered that these squirrels also employ a type of infrared heat signaling.  By using robotic models of squirrels, the researchers found that when infrared radiation was added to tail flagging, rattlesnakes shifted from predatory to defensive behavior and were less likely to attack than when no radiation component was added.

Criticism
Social scientists and others have historically criticized research in interspecies communication, characterizing it as anthropomorphizing. This perspective has become decreasingly common in recent years. A 2013 TED Talk featured a proposal to construct an Interspecies Internet by presenters musician Peter Gabriel, Internet protocol co-inventor Vint Cerf, cognitive psychologist Diana Reiss, and director of MIT's Center for Bits and Atoms Neil Gershenfeld. A follow-up workshop to review progress and plan future activities occurred in 2019 and was co-hosted by MIT's Center for Bits and Atoms, Google, and the Jeremy Coller Foundation. The ongoing efforts coalesced into a think-tank to accelerate understanding of interspecies communication. Workshops and public conferences were held in 2020 and 2021.

Animal telepathy, a variant of interspecies communication in which human psychics claim to communicate with animals by reading their minds lacks scientific evidence supporting these claims.

See also
 Animal communication
 Anna Breytenbach
 Clever Hans
 Great ape language
 Human–animal communication
 Jim Nollman
 John C. Lilly
quorum-sensing communication in bacteria
symbiosis

Further reading
 P. aeruginosa exoproducts help B. cepacia to attach to different surfaces.
The New Scientist: Lab chimp speaks his own language 2 January 2003, Anil Ananthaswamy
Doctor Dolittle's Delusion, Subtitle: Animals and the Uniqueness of Human Language. 2004 Yale University Press by Anderson

References

 
Animal communication
Cell communication